"The Hardest Button to Button" is a song by American alternative rock band the White Stripes, released as the third single from their fourth studio album, Elephant (2003). Jack White said that the song is about a child trying to find his place in a dysfunctional family when a new baby comes. The cover of the single is an allusion to the graphics of Saul Bass, seen in the movie posters and title sequences of films such as Anatomy of a Murder and The Man with the Golden Arm. The cover also alludes to Jack White's then-broken index finger and his obsession with the number three.

"The Hardest Button to Button" was first released to US alternative radio on August 11, 2003, and was issued commercially in the United Kingdom on November 17, 2003. Upon its release, the song reached number 23 on the UK Singles Chart and number eight on the US Billboard Modern Rock Tracks chart. The song's music video, directed by Michel Gondry, shows Jack and Meg White performing the song while pixilation animation is used to create the effect that numerous duplicates of their instruments appear with every beat.

Composition
"The Hardest Button to Button" is an alternative and garage rock song that runs for a duration of three minutes and thirty-two seconds. According to the sheet music published at Musicnotes.com by Universal Music Publishing Group, it is written in the time signature of common time, with a moderate rock tempo of 128 beats per minute. "The Hardest Button to Button" is composed in the key of A minor, while Jack White's vocal range spans one octave and one note, from a low of G3 to a high of A4. The song has a basic sequence of A5–C5–A5–C5–A5–C5–B5–D5 during the introduction, changes to A5–C5–A5–C5–A5–C5–B5–B5 in the verses and follows Asus4–C–Asus4–C–Asus4–C–B–B at the instrumental break as well as the refrain as its chord progression.

Music video

The music video for "The Hardest Button to Button" is the third White Stripes video directed by Michel Gondry, after "Fell in Love with a Girl" and "Dead Leaves and the Dirty Ground" (two years later, he would direct the music video for "The Denial Twist").

The video utilizes pixilation animation to create the effect of dozens of drum kits and guitar amplifiers multiplying to the rhythm of the song as Jack and Meg perform. For example, in one sequence, Meg is seen playing the bass drum at a PATH train station. On every beat, a new drum materializes just ahead of her and she instantly appears behind it to play that beat, leaving all the previous drums vacant. This effect was achieved by first setting up a trail of bass drums. Meg was filmed performing a single beat on the last drum in the line, which was then removed; she would move back one drum, play another beat, and so on. The sequence was edited and run in reverse for the video, making the drums seemingly materialize out of thin air. Gondry used 32 identical Ludwig drum kits, 32 identical amplifiers, and 16 identical microphone stands during the shoot. The drum kits were donated to a music school after the shoot. There is also a short cameo by Beck, who plays a man in a white suit presenting Jack with a "box with something in it".

Much of the video was filmed around Riverside Drive and the Columbia University area near Grant's Tomb and around the 125th Street exit and surrounding neighborhood, all part of the Upper West Side in Manhattan, New York City. Parts of the video were filmed at the 33rd Street PATH station.

Jack White also appears with a cast on his hand, after he had broken his index finger in a car accident while on tour.

The style of the video was parodied in The Simpsons episode "Jazzy and the Pussycats", in which Jack and Meg make a cameo.

Track listings
UK and Australasian CD single
 "The Hardest Button to Button"
 "St. Ides of March"
 "The Hardest Button to Button" (video)

UK 7-inch single
A. "The Hardest Button to Button" (Jack White)
B. "St. Ides of March"

Charts

Release history

In popular culture
The song and video concept is used/spoofed in The Simpsons episode "Jazzy and the Pussycats", with The White Stripes guest starring as themselves. Bart Simpson starts playing to the song, imitating the video routine, until eventually crashing into Meg's drumkit. She and Jack chase Bart until he leaves them suspended in midair over an open drawbridge at the end of a riff, and they fall onto a garbage barge.

The song is a playable track in Rock Band 3.

The song was used on a trailer for the Justice League movie. Previously another White Stripes song, "Icky Thump", was used for a trailer of the same movie.

References

External links
 
 [ Allmusic: "The Hardest Button to Button"]. Retrieved September 5, 2005.
 The White Stripes (include lyrics). Retrieved September 5, 2005.
 "The White Stripes on Elephant". Retrieved April 19, 2006. Archived on web.archive.org, archive retrieved October 23, 2006.

2003 singles
2003 songs
Music videos directed by Michel Gondry
Songs written by Jack White
Third Man Records singles
UK Independent Singles Chart number-one singles
V2 Records singles
XL Recordings singles
The White Stripes songs